Choejeongsan is a mountain in the city of Daegu, South Korea. It can be found in the county Dalseong, in the western part of the city.

See also
List of mountains in Korea

Notes

References

Mountains of South Korea